Peter S. Fader is the Frances and Pei-Yuan Chia Professor of Marketing at The Wharton School of the University of Pennsylvania. His research is about the analysis of behavioral data to forecast customer shopping/purchasing activities.

Career 
Fader was introduced to marketing when he was a math major undergraduate in MIT by Professor Leigh McAlister. Later in an interview, Fader called McAlister his "fairy god mother" for his career in marketing. Fader works with firms from a plethora of industries, such as telecommunications, financial services, gaming/entertainment, retailing, and pharmaceuticals. Managerial applications focus on topics such as management of customer relationships, lifetime value of the customer, and sales predictions for new products. Much of his research highlights the consistent behavioral patterns that exist across these industries and other domains.

In addition to his various roles at Wharton, Professor Fader co-founded a predictive analytics firm named Zodiac in 2015, which was sold to Nike in 2018. He then co-founded and still works at Theta Equity Partners to commercialize his more recent work on “customer-based corporate valuation.”

He has been quoted or featured in The New York Times, The Wall Street Journal, The Economist, The Washington Post, TEDx, among other media.

Works 
Fader is the author of Customer Centricity: Focus on the Right Customers for Strategic Advantage and co-authored with Sarah E. Toms of the book The Customer Centricity Playbook: Implement a Winning Strategy Driven by Customer Lifetime Value.

Awards 
He is the current recipient of the Pei-Yuan Chia Professorship. He has held this award since 2003.

He was named one of the 25 Marketing Technology Trailblazers by Advertising Age.

References

University of Pennsylvania faculty
Wharton School of the University of Pennsylvania faculty
Marketing theorists
American marketing people
Massachusetts Institute of Technology School of Science alumni
Year of birth missing (living people)
Living people